The 2010 Australian Superkart season covers national level Superkart racing in Australia during 2010. There were just two national level race meetings in 2010, both held on the calendar of the Shannons Nationals Motor Racing Championships, making up the 2010 Dunlop Australian Superkart Championship.

Darren Hossack, Martin Latta and Steven Tamasi won the Australian championships.

Australian Superkart Championship
The 2010 Dunlop Australian Superkart Championship was the 22nd running of the national championships for Superkarts.  It began on 1 May 2010 at Phillip Island Grand Prix Circuit and will end on 15 August at Morgan Park Raceway after eight races. It was contested for three engine configuration based classes, 250 cc International, 250 National and 125 cc.

A third national level event was scheduled for 29–30 May at Mallala Motor Sport Park for the non-gearbox Rotax Max family of classes, but did not go ahead due to poor competitor support. The event was later rescheduled for 29 October at Wakefield Park to be held as the 2010 Australian Rotax Superkart Nationals.

Teams and drivers
The following drivers competed in the 2010 Australian Superkart Championship. The series consisted of two rounds, with four races at each meeting.

Season review
Former 100 cc non-gearbox Superkart Champion Gary Pegoraro finally broke through to claim a round win of the Australian Superkart Championship after coming close on many occasions in the last four years. Pegoraro won the wet second race as well as the bonus point fourth race at Phillip Island and finished third in the other two races in a consistent and fast weekend. 2008 champion Darren Hossack capitalised on a mistake by Trevor Roberts on the second last corner to win race 3 and combined that with second places in races two and four to be just five points behind Pegoraro as Anderson Karts dominated the opening round. Visiting Northern Ireland racer Trevor Roberts finished third for the round on his first visit to Australia with second places in races one and three and a third in the fourth race. Race one winner Warren McIlveen sat fourth in the points, slowed by a disappointing result in race three.

Best of the rest was Anton Stevens, whose PVP claimed a third and a fourth over the weekend and was consistently fast near the front runners. Defending champion Sam Zavaglia had a lot of work to do to come from 40 points down and sat ninth behind Ilya Harpas and Chryss Jamieson.

Luke May and Martin Latta fought over the 250 National class all weekend, trading firsts and seconds. A third-place finish in race 2 for Latta made the difference and May led the series by two points. David Yuill led the rest of the resurgent class, competing for Australian championship status for the first time since 2006. Yuill was fast in the very wet second race on Sunday morning, finishing just behind May, well up in the top ten overall. Consistency put perennial 250 National race Frank Giglio fourth in the points, ahead of STR's Matthew Palmer, the de facto defending class champion.

Twice former 125 cc champion Darren Dunn made a blitzing return to the class, winning the final race of the weekend to pull ten points clear of defending champion Steven Tamasi. Tamasi won the first race of the weekend on Saturday afternoon but Sunday saw the teenager plagued with power issues which saw him last across the line in race four. The weekend saw each race claimed by a different racer; veteran Jeff Reed won race two to be third in the points behind Tamasi while race-three winner Anothony Lappas languished seventh after a pair of retirements slowed his weekend. Brad Stebbing and John Pellicano sat fourth and fifth.

Results and standings

Gearbox race calendar
The 2010 Dunlop Australian Superkart Championship season consisted of two rounds. Four races were held at both race meetings.

Drivers Championship
Points were awarded 20-17-15-13-11-10-9-8-7-6-5-4-3-2-1 based on the top fifteen race positions in first three races of each round. The fourth race of each round, which is longer than the others (eight laps vs five laps) awarded points for the top twenty race positions at 25-22-20-18-16-15-14-13-12–11-10-9-8-7-6-5-4-3-2-1. Points sourced from in part:

References

External links
 Official championship website
 CAMS Manual reference to Australian titles

Superkart Championship
Australian Superkart Championship